Christian Gartner (born 3 April 1994) is an Austrian footballer.

Career
In June 2013, Gartner moved to Fortuna Düsseldorf, who had been relegated from the Bundesliga to 2. Bundesliga in the previous season, from SV Mattersburg. In summer 2017, he was released by the club having made 49 league appearances with 2 goals and 1 assist.

On 3 January 2018, free agent Gartner joined MSV Duisburg, signing a contract until 2019 with an option. He left Duisburg after the 2018–19 season.

References

External links

1994 births
Living people
Association football midfielders
Austrian footballers
Austria youth international footballers
Austrian Football Bundesliga players
SV Mattersburg players
Fortuna Düsseldorf players
MSV Duisburg players
Austrian expatriate footballers
Expatriate footballers in Germany
Austrian expatriate sportspeople in Germany
2. Bundesliga players